Kennedy Dela Cruz Alfonso (born February 20, 1990), known professionally as Ken Alfonso is a Filipino singer and television actor, who played the role of Gamil in GMA Network's requel of Encantadia.

Biography
Alfonso became famous for his role of Thomas in the teledrama Kailan Ba Tama ang Mali? the cast of Geoff Eigenmann, Max Collins, Empress Schuck, Dion Ignacio and Ervic Vijandre. He became notable and popular for his short but long-lived role in Encantadia's requel as the Lirean soldier — Sang'gre Mira's father whom netizens chants that he is the one wasted by Hara Pirena. He appeared with Janice Hung, Solenn Heussaff, Julianne Lee, Kate Valdez, Zoren Legaspi, and Glaiza de Castro among other cast.

Filmography

Television

Discography
"Umaasa" Released in 2014 Under GMA Records. ("Theme From Koreanovela, Secret Love")

References

External links
 

1991 births
Living people
Filipino male child actors
Filipino male models
Filipino male television actors
Filipino male film actors
GMA Network personalities